Naomi Fern Parker Fraley (August 26, 1921 – January 20, 2018) was an American war worker who is considered the most likely model for the iconic "We Can Do It!" poster.  During World War II, she worked on aircraft assembly at the Naval Air Station Alameda.  She was photographed operating a machine tool and this widely used photograph was thought to be an inspiration for the poster. Geraldine Hoff Doyle was initially credited as the subject, but this was refuted by later research.

After the war, she worked as a waitress in Palm Springs, California, and married three times. When she died, aged 96 in 2018, she was survived by her son and six stepchildren.

Early life

Naomi Fern Parker was born in Tulsa, Oklahoma, in 1921, as the third of eight children to Joseph Parker and Esther Leis. Her father was a mining engineer and her mother was a homemaker. The family moved across the country from New York to California, living in Alameda at the time of the attack on Pearl Harbor. Naomi and her younger sister Ada went to work at the Naval Air station, where they were assigned to the machine shop for aircraft assembling duties.

We Can Do It!

In 1942, Parker's photo, taken at a Pratt & Whitney horizontal shaper, appeared in local press including the Pittsburgh Press on July 5, 1942. The following year, J. Howard Miller's "We Can Do It!" poster was one of a series that appeared in factories at Westinghouse in a worker morale campaign. Miller could have seen the picture of Parker, and it is presumed that the newspaper photo was the source of his image.

In 2011, Parker attended a reunion held at the Rosie the Riveter/World War II Home Front National Historical Park and spotted her photograph from 1942. She was surprised to find that the caption credited the model as Geraldine Hoff Doyle, and wrote to the park to correct their mistake. The mistake stemmed from a mistake made by Doyle, who had mistaken the 1942 photograph for a photograph of herself. This mis-identification then became well-established as sources repeated it (an example of the Woozle effect).

Kimble investigation
Meanwhile, Seton Hall University professor James J. Kimble had become interested in the poster, which had become an icon of the feminist movement. He tracked down the original photo and found that it was credited to Naomi Parker in 1942. When the photograph was taken, Doyle was still at school and she had only worked at the plant for a few weeks. When he tracked down Parker in 2015 to show her the photo, she still had the cutting from 1942. Kimble was certain that Parker was the woman in the photo and considered her to be the strongest candidate behind the inspiration for the poster, but noted that Miller did not leave any writings which could identify his model.

In February 2015, Kimble interviewed the Parker sisters, known as Naomi Fern Fraley (Parker) and Ada Wyn Morford, aged 93 and 91 respectively, and found that they had known for five years about the incorrect identification of the photo, and had been rebuffed in their attempt to correct the historical record.

Later life
After the war, Parker worked as a waitress at The Doll House, a restaurant in Palm Springs, California. She was married three times, first to Joseph Blankenship (divorced), secondly to John Muhlig (d. 1971), and third to Charles Fraley (d. 1998), whom she married in 1979. In February 2017 she moved to the Longview, Washington area before moving into an assisted care home there later that year.

Death
On January 20, 2018, Parker died in Longview, Washington, at the age of 96. The following month, her life was celebrated on BBC Radio 4's obituary program Last Word.

See also
 American women in World War II
 Pasha Angelina
 Veronica Foster

References

External links
 Uncovering the Secret Identity of Rosie the Riveter at History.com

1921 births
2018 deaths
American women civilians in World War II
People from Tulsa, Oklahoma
Restaurant staff
Machinists
People from Longview, Washington
20th-century American women